Spur 450 is a highway spur in the Midland–Odessa metropolitan area in the U.S. state of Texas. The highway is named Kermit Highway.

Route description
Spur 450 begins at a junction with SH 302/Loop 338 in West Odessa. The highway travels in a southeast direction down Kermit Highway and enters Odessa near an intersection with FM 1882. Spur 450 ends at an intersection with US 385 just north of downtown Odessa.

History
Spur 450 was designated on September 26, 1967 along the current route. The highway follows an old route of SH 302 through Odessa.

Junction list

References

0450
Transportation in Ector County, Texas